Irani cafés are Iranian-style cafés in the Indian subcontinent. They were originally opened by Zoroastrian Irani immigrants to British India in the 19th century, fleeing Safavid persecution or looking for better economic prospects. In India, Mumbai, Pune and Hyderabad boast a number of Irani cafés, which are very popular for Irani chai (tea). In the 1950s, there were 350 Irani cafés; today, only 25 remain. Karachi, Pakistan, was also home to many Irani cafés.

History 
They were originally opened by Zoroastrian Irani immigrants to British India in the 19th century after they fled from Safavid persecution in West and Central Asia.

Writing for the Hindu Business Line, on "Mumbai's Irani hotspots", Sarika Mehta stated, "The classic format of these cafes is basic with a subtle colonial touch; high ceilings with black, bent wooden chairs (now cane in some cafes), wooden tables with marble tops and glass jars that allow a peek into the goodies they hold. With huge glass mirrors on the walls to create a feeling of space, visitors are greeted with eagerness and a whiff of baking. The speed of operations is impressive and service quite hassle-free."

Fare
Irani cafés may serve bun maska (bread and butter) or brun-maska (hard buttered croissants), and paani kam chai (a strong Iranian tea,  'tea with less water'), or khari chai (very strong tea), mutton samosas, and kheema pav (minced meat served in bread rolls), akuri (scrambled eggs and vegetables), berry pulao, vegetable puff, vegetarian/chicken dhansak (a spiced lentil dish with meat and vegetables) and biryani, cherry cream custard, cheese khari biscuits, plain khari biscuits, coconut jam and milk biscuits and Duke's raspberry drink.

Many Irani cafés offer sweet and salted biscuits like rawa (semolina), til-rawa coconut, nankhatai (sweet, crisp flaky Irani biscuits), Madeira cake (tutti-frutti biscuits).

Cultural references 
Nissim Ezekiel wrote a poem based on instruction boards found in his favourite Irani café: the defunct Bastani and Company in Dhobi Talao, Mumbai.

In 2020 Neeraj Udhwani made the film Maska.

Footnotes

Further reading
  India's Iranian cafes fading out by Jayshree Bajoria for BBC News, Mumbai
 Mumbai's Irani hotspots – Sarika Mehta in Hindu Business line
 AOL News Blog - Sunanda Sudhir

External links

 Irani Cafés and Bakeries: An Irani Zartoshti Tradition

Indian drinks
Coffeehouses and cafés in India
Coffeehouses and cafés in Pakistan
Culture of Mumbai
Culture of Karachi
Restaurants in Mumbai
Bakery cafés
Iranian diaspora in Pakistan
Pakistani fusion cuisine